Morning Bugle is a bluegrass album by US musician John Hartford. It was released in 1972 on Warner Bros. Records.

Production
Morning Bugle is Hartford's second and final album for Warner Bros. Records and was recorded at Bearsville Studios in Bearsville, New York.  The music was all written by Hartford. The album features jazz bassist Dave Holland, who performs with both Hartford and Norman Blake for the very first time.

Reception

Writing for Allmusic, critic Jim Worbois called the album "One of Hartford's finest records. Done mostly live in the studio with virtually no over-dubs, this is a fine collection of song covering a variety of subjects."

Track listing
All tracks composed by John Hartford; except where indicated
"Streetcar" – 3:54
"Nobody Eats at Linebaugh's Anymore" – 4:52
"Howard Hughes' Blues" – 2:52
"All Fall Down" – 3:11
"On the Road" – 3:44
"Morning Bugle" – 2:22
"Old Joe Clark"  – 5:48
"My Rag" – 3:40
"Late Last Night When My Willie Came Home"  (Traditional) – 3:19
"Got No Place to Go" – 4:18
"Bye-Bye" – 3:20

Personnel
John Hartford - banjo, guitar, violin, vocals
Norman Blake - guitar, mandolin
Dave Holland - bass

Production
Producer, Liner Notes: John Simon
Recording Engineer: Mark Harman
Mixing (CD Edition): Toby Mountain
Cover Illustration: Don Punchatz
Photography, Art Direction: Ed Thrasher

References

John Hartford albums
1972 albums
Albums produced by John Simon (record producer)
Warner Records albums